Spring Creek is an unincorporated community in Greenbrier County, West Virginia, United States.

An early variant name was Hankins; the present name is from nearby Spring Creek.

References

Unincorporated communities in Greenbrier County, West Virginia
Unincorporated communities in West Virginia